Headreach Island is a small island in the Sacramento–San Joaquin River Delta, in northern California. A naturally-formed island existing in a complex with Tule Island to the southeast and Fern Island to the northwest, it was used for farming as late as the 1920s. While several proposals for real estate development on the island were made in the late 20th century, it now consists mostly of marsh and submerged land. Black rails live on the island.

Geography
Headreach Island is part of San Joaquin County.

History
Headreach Island is mentioned as early as 1910, when several high school students took a boat there from nearby Acker Island. Of this,  were irrigated as farmland, with  devoted to onions and  devoted to potatoes.

In the 1930s, the construction of the Stockton Deepwater Shipping Channel involved constructing protective levees around many islands in the Sacramento–San Joaquin River Delta, levees across Headreach Island and Roberts Island were built by the Franks Contracting Company with clamshell dredgers. By June 1931, the levees were 50% completed.

The island appears on a 1952 USGS map of the area. In a 1972 report from the U.S. Army Corps of Engineers, the Fern-Headreach-Tule complex was addressed in a proposal for a project to protect the banks of the Stockton Ship Channel. The report noted that (in contrast to other islands in the area) the complex was "not reclaimed agricultural land, but an area of near-natural state". At the time, the complex contained "virtually no permanent residential developments". A 1974 report, by the same agency, said that Headreach Island had been used in the past for the disposal of dredging spoils.

In 1978, the island was owned by the Port of Stockton. The Modesto Bee reported  in January that a $5 to $6 million development (equivalent to $ to $ in ) on Headreach Island and nearby Tule Island had been proposed (including a two-story marina, a restaurant, and bar). In May, the Bee reported that the "major recreational area" had been approved on Headreach Island by the San Joaquin County Board of Supervisors.

In 1982, a feasibility report on environmental enhancement measures for the area noted that the island complex was a habitat for the black rail and other waterfowl. A proposal was made, in that document, to construct a "boater destination site" at Headreach Island consisting of a day-use dock as well as two chemical toilets.

References

Islands of San Joaquin County, California
Islands of the Sacramento–San Joaquin River Delta
Islands of Northern California